Stephen Thomas (born 23 June 1979) is a former professional footballer who played in the Football League for Wrexham and Darlington. He was born in Hartlepool, England, and represented Wales at under-21 international level.

Thomas was signed by York City in February 2006.

Notes

External links

1979 births
Living people
Footballers from Hartlepool
Welsh footballers
Wales under-21 international footballers
Association football midfielders
Wrexham A.F.C. players
Darlington F.C. players
York City F.C. players
English Football League players
National League (English football) players